80P/Peters–Hartley is a periodic comet in the Solar System with an orbital period of 8.12 years.

It was originally discovered by Christian Heinrich Friedrich Peters of Capodimonte Observatory, Naples, Italy. There was insufficient data to accurately compute the orbit, and the comet was lost for well over a hundred years.

It was accidentally rediscovered by Malcolm Hartley at the UK Schmidt Telescope Unit, Siding Spring, Australia on a photographic plate exposed on 11 July 1982. He estimated its brightness at a magnitude of 15. The sighting was confirmed by the Perth Observatory, where M. C. Candy calculated the orbit and concluded that Hartley had indeed relocated the lost Peter's comet. I. Hasegawa and Syuichi Nakano had simultaneously reached the same conclusion.

It was observed at its next apparition in 1990 by R. H. McNaught of the Siding Spring observatory, who described as diffuse with a brightness of magnitude 14. It was subsequently observed in 1998, 2006 and 2014.

See also
 List of numbered comets
 List of comets by type

References 

Periodic comets
0080
Comets in 2014
18460626